The 1966 Chatham Cup was the 39th annual nationwide knockout football competition in New Zealand.

The competition was run on a regional basis, with 17 regional associations holding separate qualification rounds. The winners of each of these qualification tournaments, along with the second-placed team from Auckland, qualified for the competition proper. In all, 91 teams took part in the competition, 32 from the South Island and 59 from the North Island. Note: Different sources record different numbers for the rounds of this competition, with some confusion caused by differing numbers of rounds in regional qualification.

The 1966 final
The final was the first since 1962 to feature no Auckland teams. Rangers had the stronger of the two finalist sides, with strong players such as goalkeeper Peter Whiting and brothers Les and Barry Taylor. In a gritty but largely uninspiring final, Western had most of the play, coming close to scoring on several occasions, with one goal disallowed and another shot hitting the woodwork. As the game progressed Rangers came into their own, taking the lead through a Les Taylor shot which hit the upright before ricocheting into the net. The ball had been the result of a parried clearance by Western keeper David Smith of a Stef Billing header.

Results

Third round

*match won by Wanganui East on corners

Fourth round

Fifth round

Quarter-finals

Semi-finals

Replay

Final

References

Rec.Sport.Soccer Statistics Foundation New Zealand 1966 page
ultimatenzsoccer.com 1966 Chatham Cup page

Chatham Cup
Chatham Cup
Chatham Cup
September 1966 sports events in New Zealand